Chana, chhana, or chaná may refer to :

Food 
 Chickpea, known in South Asia as chana
 Chhana, a type of curds from South Asia

Places 
 Chana, Illinois, United States, an unincorporated community
 Chana District, Songkhla Province, southern Thailand

Other uses 
 Chang'an Motors commercial vehicles sub-brand known as Chana, a Chinese automaker
 Chaná people, an ethnic group of Uruguay
 Chaná language, an extinct language of Uruguay and Argentina
 Chana (Bible), alternate transliteration of Hannah, a Biblical character; sometimes spelled "Chane"
 Woman with seven sons, a character in 2 Maccabees, sometimes called Chana
 Rosanna Tavarez, an American singer who used Chana as a stage name

People with the name 
 Ameet Chana (born 1975), British-Indian actor
 Arjan Drayton Chana (born 1994), English field hockey player
 Chana Blaksztejn, a Polish-Jewish writer and journalist
 Chana Bloch (1940–2017), American poet, translator, and scholar
 Chana Eden (1932–2019), Israeli-American actress and singer
 Chana Joffe-Walt, radio journalist and producer
 Chana Katan (born 1958), American-born Israeli gynecologist, and public figure
 Chana Kowalska (1907–1942), Polish painter and journalist
 Chana Masson (born 1978), Brazilian handball player
 Chana Orloff (1888–1968), Ukraine-born sculptor
 Chana Pilane-Majake, South African politician
 Chana Porpaoin (born 1966), Thai boxer
 Chana Schneerson (1880–1964), wife of a Chabad Hasidic rabbi in Ukraine
 Chana Timoner (1951–1998), American rabbi
 Khuli Chana (born 1982), South African Motswako rapper
 Navjot Chana (born 1983), Indian martial artist
 Pindi Chana (born 1974), Tanzanian politician
 Tarlochan Singh Chana (born 1949), Kenyan field hockey player

See also
 Chano (disambiguation)
 Channa (disambiguation)
 Chana School